Xanthus, son of Ptolemy, was the king of Thebes, the 16th and final monarch that ruled the city. He was possibly king only temporarily, being shown at times as the king of the Boeotians, the King of the Thebians. He was killed by either Andropompus or Melanthus of Attica.

Notes

References 

 Pausanias, Description of Greece with an English Translation by W.H.S. Jones, Litt.D., and H.A. Ormerod, M.A., in 4 Volumes. Cambridge, MA, Harvard University Press; London, William Heinemann Ltd. 1918. . Online version at the Perseus Digital Library
 Pausanias, Graeciae Descriptio. 3 vols. Leipzig, Teubner. 1903.  Greek text available at the Perseus Digital Library.

Theban kings
Kings in Greek mythology
Theban characters in Greek mythology